WDMZ-LP is a low powered FM radio station broadcasting at 92.7 MHz. Licensed to Benton, Kentucky, United States, WDMZ-LP broadcasts a variety format, and is owned by Falcon Communications Corp.

References

External links
 
 https://m.facebook.com/WDMZ927/

DMZ-LP
DMZ-LP
Variety radio stations in the United States
Radio stations established in 2014
2014 establishments in Kentucky